American National Bank of Texas (ANBTXSM) is an independently owned community bank with 28 branches in North Texas, providing personal and business banking services. ANBTX also offers asset management, financial planning, investment services, and trust and estate services through ANBTX Wealth Management.

Founded in 1875, ANBTX reports over $5.1 billion in total assets, and ranks as the 21st largest bank based in Texas, according to size of total assets as of June 30, 2022. ANBTX is a member of the Federal Deposit Insurance Corporation (FDIC), and participates in the Deposit Insurance Fund (DIF). The bank is headquartered in Terrell, Texas, with locations in Collin, Dallas, Hunt, Johnson, Kaufman, Rockwall, Tarrant, and Van Zandt counties. Robert A. Hulsey has been president and CEO of ANBTX since 1989.

Charter
Formerly named American National Bank of Terrell, the bank’s current charter dates to July 1, 1981, as a commercial bank,  with a federal charter supervised by the Office of the Comptroller of the Currency (OCC).

History and predecessors
The predecessor of ANBTX—Waters, Bivins & Corley Bank—was the first bank founded in Terrell on November 22, 1875. The bank’s building was destroyed by a fire in 1882, but bank records and securities were protected in the bank’s vault. The bank relocated to Moore Avenue in Terrell; today that location houses the Terrell banking center for ANBTX. After some early partners joined and left the bank, the bank merged with Harris Bank and renamed itself Harris National Bank in 1895. In 1903, the bank changed its name to the American National Bank of Terrell. In 1930, the American National Bank of Terrell merged with federally  chartered local bank First National Bank. In 1995, American National Bank of Terrell changed its name to its current name, American National Bank of Texas.

Major acquisitions
The Bank of Van Zandt: ANBTX merged with The Bank of Van Zandt, located in Canton, TX, in 1999. The merger increased ANBTX assets to more than $650 million at the time.

Branches of Benchmark Bank: ANBTX acquired five branch locations of Benchmark Bank in October 2002, in Quinlan, Greenville, Royse City, and Lone Oak, TX.

Sleeper, Sewell & Co.: Acquired by ANBTX in 2005, Sleeper Sewell offers personal and commercial insurance, group and individual health coverage, and risk management services. It currently operates as a division of ANBTX Insurance Services Inc., which is a wholly owned subsidiary of ANBTX. Sleeper Sewell was founded in 1962 by Dwight Sleeper and is headquartered in Dallas.

Citizens National Bank: ANBTX expanded operations into Tarrant County by purchasing Bryant-Irvin Bancshares and its subsidiary Citizens National Bank in 2008. Citizens National Bank based in Fort Worth, TX, reported $140 million in total assets at the time of the acquisition.

Dallas National Bank: In 2008, ANBTX acquired Dallas National Bank and its holding company DNB Bancshares. Dallas National Bank had $85 million in assets at the time of the acquisition. The purchase increased the number of ANBTX locations to 28.

Media recognition
The Dallas Morning News has named ANBTX on its annual “Top 100 Places to Work” list from 2009 to 2022. This is the thirteenth time ANBTX has achieved this significant recognition as a top employer in the Dallas-Fort Worth Metroplex. The newspaper conducts employee surveys, studies employee turnover rates and uses other statistical measures to compile its annual list.

In 2012, ANBTX was named as one of the “Top 10 Best Companies for Employee Financial Security” by Principal Financial Services. An independent panel from the employee benefits and human resources industries judged entries and selected the 10 companies for the award, working with the public opinion and market research firm of Mathew Greenwald & Associates.

Timeline
November 22, 1875: Waters, Bivins & Corley Bank opens
1882: Fire destroys its building; records and securities protected in bank’s vault; bank reopens
1887: Name changes to The Harris Bank
1895: Name changes to The Harris National Bank
1903: Name changes to The American National Bank of Terrell
1913: Walter P. Allen named president
1930: Merges with federally  chartered The First National Bank; retains name American National Bank of Terrell
1943: Ben L. Gill Jr. named president
1967: Riter C. Hulsey named president
1989: Robert A. Hulsey named president and CEO; acquires Independent Bank with locations in Rockwall and Wylie, TX
April 19, 1990: Acquires First State Bank of Crandall (TX)
1994: Acquires First National Bank of Allen (TX)
February 1, 1995: Name changes to The American National Bank of Texas (ANBTX)
1997: Acquires branches of Bank of America in Greenville and Wills Point, TX
June 1, 1999: Acquires The Bank of Van Zandt
2000: Launches website
2002: Acquires five branches of Benchmark Bank (in Quinlan, Greenville, Royse City, Lone Oak); acquires Jefferson Heritage Bank in Rockwall; acquires Union Planters Bank in Rowlett, TX
2006: Acquires Sleeper, Sewell & Company
February 23, 2008: Acquires Bryant-Irvin Bancshares, Inc. and its subsidiary, Citizens National Bank
June 6, 2008: Acquires Dallas National Bank
2009–2022: Named a Top 100 Places to Work by Dallas Morning News
2013: Sleeper Sewell Insurance Services Inc. acquires Planned Benefits Services, Inc.
September 7, 2018: Acquires G-6 Corporation and its subsidiary, First State Bank in Mesquite
2018: Sells ANBTX Insurance Services, a wholly-owned subsidiary, to DMS Insurance Holdings, LLC

Locations

As of November 2022, ANBTX reported having locations in the following North Texas markets: 

Allen, Texas 
Burleson, Texas 
Canton, Texas 
Crandall, Texas 
Dallas, Texas 
Forney, Texas 
Fort Worth, Texas 
Greenville, Texas 
Heath, Texas 
Hurst, Texas 
Kaufman, Texas 
Mansfield, Texas 
McKinney, Texas 
Mesquite, Texas 
Plano, Texas 
Quinlan, Texas 
Rockwall, Texas 
Rowlett, Texas 
Royse City, Texas 
Sachse, Texas 
Seagoville, Texas 
Terrell, Texas 
Wills Point, Texas 
Wylie, Texas

References

External links
Official website

Companies based in Texas
Banks based in Texas
Banks based in the Dallas–Fort Worth metroplex
Banks established in 1875
American companies established in 1875
1875 establishments in Texas